Marco de la O is a Mexican actor, best known for the lead role of Joaquín "El Chapo" Guzmán in the Netflix and Univision television series El Chapo. He starred opposite Sylvester Stallone in Rambo: Last Blood in 2019. He starred in a lead role opposite Paulina Dávila and Mauricio Ochmann in limited television series R, a joint venture between Viacom International and Spanish-language distributor Clarovideo in mid-2020. He is set to star in the second season of Falsa Identidad opposite Camila Sodi, Luis Ernesto Franco, Eduardo Yañez, and Sonya Smith in late 2020.

Selected television
Tanto amor (2015)
Un día cualquiera (2016)
El Chapo (2017-2018)
Falsa Identidad (2020-2021)

Selected filmography
Rambo: Last Blood (2019) as Manuel

References

External links

Living people
Mexican male film actors
Mexican male television actors
Year of birth missing (living people)